The 1962–63 Women's basketball European Cup was the fifth edition of the competition. It was won by Slavia Sofia, who defeated Slovan Orbis Prague in the final. Previously Slavia had beaten in the semifinals Daugava Riga, who had won the three previous competitions. This was Slavia's second and last European Cup title, and Daugava's only failure in its 1960-75 European Cup run.

For the first time the defending champion's national championship was not allowed a second spot, and a second team (eventual champion Slavia Sofia) was given a bye to the quarter-finals. Switzerland took part in the championship for the first time, while Israel, Morocco and Turkey retired and Yugoslavia didn't enter the competition, leaving it in 12 teams. Africa was still represented by Benfica de Lubango, from Portuguese Angola.

Qualification round

Round of 16

Quarter-finals

Semifinals

Final

References

Champions Cup
European
European
EuroLeague Women seasons